Abbas Nalbandian (1947 – 28 May 1989) was an Iranian playwright who wrote several absurdist plays in the 1960s and 1970s. His plays had very long and strange names. For example, his first play was “A deep, big and new research about fossils of 25th genealogy period, or 20th, or any other period, there is no difference” (1966). Nalbandian was under the effects of European absurdist theatre and he tried to bring new ideas and methods from European drama into Iranian drama. He committed suicide on 28 May 1987. He recorded his voice at the time of dying.

Some of his plays 
 A deep, big and new research about fossils of 25th genealogy period, or 20th, or any other period, there is no difference (1966 )
 If Faust was a real friend (1967)
 Research (1968)
 Putting a chair by the window and sitting on it and watching a long, dark, calm, cold night of the desert (1970)
 Harem (1977)
 Stories from the Rains of Love and Death  (1977)

References

1947 births
1989 suicides
Iranian dramatists and playwrights
20th-century dramatists and playwrights
Place of birth missing
1989 deaths
Suicides in Iran